The National Insurance Contributions Act 2006 (c 10) is an Act of the Parliament of the United Kingdom. It amends the law relating to national insurance contributions. Its precursor was an announcement made in the Paymaster General's Pre-Budget Report 2004.

HM Revenue and Customs estimated that the Act would secure £95 million in national insurance contributions for the financial year 2004-05 and £240 million per annum in subsequent years.

References
Halsbury's Statutes,

External links
The National Insurance Contributions Act 2006, as amended from the National Archives.
The National Insurance Contributions Act 2006, as originally enacted from the National Archives.
Explanatory notes to the National Insurance Contributions Act 2006.

United Kingdom Acts of Parliament 2006
National Insurance